Asshok Iyengar Harrsha Vardhan (born 8 December 1990) is an Indian cricketer. He made his first-class debut for Hyderabad in the 2014–15 Ranji Trophy on 13 January 2015.

References

External links
 

1990 births
Living people
Indian cricketers
Hyderabad cricketers